The Hansa-Brandenburg W.20 was a German submarine-launched reconnaissance flying boat of the World War I era, designed and built by Hansa-Brandenburg.

Design and development
Due to the need to be stored and launched from a submarine aircraft carrier, the W.20 was a small single-seat biplane flying boat that was designed to be assembled and dismantled quickly. It had a slender hull on which was mounted a biplane wing and a conventional braced tailplane. It was powered by a seven-cylinder, 80 PS Oberursel U.0 rotary engine — basically a German-made near-clone of the Gnome Lambda pre-war French rotary — mounted on struts between the wings driving a pusher propeller. The pilot had an open cockpit just forward of the lower wing. Because of the slender hull stabilising floats were fitted below and at the end of the lower wings. The submarine intended to carry the W.20 was not built and only three W.20s were built.

Specifications (3rd built)

See also

References

Notes

Bibliography

W.20
1910s German military reconnaissance aircraft
Flying boats
Submarine-borne aircraft
Single-engined pusher aircraft
Biplanes
Rotary-engined aircraft
Aircraft first flown in 1918